Leia is a variant of the Hebrew Leah, meaning languid in different languages, including Koine Greek and Portuguese.  It is commonly used in reference to Leia Organa, a character from Star Wars. The name was among the top 1,000 names for girls in the United States in 1978, shortly after the release of the 1977 film Star Wars, and again in 1980, after the release of the 1980 film The Empire Strikes Back. It then declined in use but rose again in usage during the 21st century. The name has been among the 1,000 most popular  names for newborn girls in the United States since 2006 and among the top 300 since 2017.  It has also been among the top 500 names in use for girls in the United Kingdom between 1998 and 2002, in 2005, in 2009, and between 2015 and 2020.

Notable people
Leia Dongue, (born 1991), Mozambican basketball player
Léia Scheinvar (born 1954), Brazilian-Mexican botanist
Leia Stirling (born 1981), American academic, Charles Stark Draper Professor of Aeronautics at Massachusetts Institute of Technology and co-director of the human systems laboratory.
Leia Zhu, (born 2006), British-Chinese classical violinist

References

Greek feminine given names
Given names of Hebrew language origin